The 21st Theater Sustainment Command (21st TSC) provides theater sustainment throughout EUCOM and AFRICOM Areas of Responsibility in support of USAREUR and 7th Army. On order, deploys to support theater opening, distribution, and Reception, Staging, Onward Movement & enable Integration (RSO&I) functions. Be prepared to support Joint and Coalition forces.

History
The heritage of 21st Theater Sustainment Command began on 23 June 1965 with the activation of the 1st Support Brigade. The 21st TSC originated as a maintenance support headquarters under Seventh Army Support Command, the brigade's first home was Taylor Barracks, Mannheim, Germany.

After the United States military withdrawal from France in 1967 and the organization of the U.S. Theater Army Support Command, Europe, informally known as TASCOM, the brigade became the rear-area counterpart of the newly formed corps support commands. Assigned to TASCOM in 1969, 1st Support Brigade was responsible for Prepositioning of Materiel Configured to Unit Sets (POMCUS) and provided combat service support for U.S. units in the area west of the Rhein River.

In 1974, TASCOM was merged with Headquarters, United States Army Europe, and the missions of 1st Support Brigade were expanded to include base operations support for eight military communities as well as the management of regional area support. The brigade was upgraded to a general officer command and the headquarters moved to Kleber Kaserne, Kaiserslautern, Germany.

By mid-1976 the 1st Support Brigade's personnel strength was approximately 16,000 – the largest brigade in the U.S. Army. Consequently, the Department of the Army approved the elevation of the commander's position to major general and on 19 August 1976 the brigade was re-designated 21st Support Command. The command came to include the 47th Area Support Group with a major depot located at RAF Burtonwood, Cheshire, in the United Kingdom, stockpiling POMCUS equipment. Other units included Combat Equipment Group Europe, 29th Area Support Group, and 60th Ordnance Group.

During the next several years, important missions and units were assigned to the 21st and, in June 1981, the President of the United States elevated the commander's position to lieutenant general, reflecting the organization's status as a Theater Army Area Command. Accordingly, on 18 October 1988, 21st Support Command was officially re-designated the 21st Theater Army Area Command.

After the dissolution of the Soviet Union, U.S. forces in Europe began a reduction in personnel to accompany the reduced threat. Authorizations for both military and civilian positions were decreased substantially and, in 1993, the grade of the 21st TAACOM commander was returned to major general.

On 18 October 2000 the 21st TAACOM structure was replaced by the Army and U.S. Army Europe and transformed into the 21st Theater Sustainment Command (TSC). In 2006, the 21st TSC HQ further changed by absorbing some functions of some of its former units, such as the 200th MMC (Material Management, formerly the US Army Material Command, Europe,(MATCOM) located in Zweibruecken, and 1st TMCA (Transportation Movement Control) because these units deactivated. This restructuring was needed to meet the needs of the Army and the nation in the 21st century, by becoming a deploy able force. This change made the 21st the Army's largest forward deployed unit and a major forward presence, in theater logistics organization in support of Central Region, Europe.

Throughout this evolution the 21st has retained the lineage and honors, distinguishing flag (colors), and distinctive unit badge and shoulder sleeve insignia of the "FIRST IN SUPPORT!"

Current Structure 
 21st Theater Sustainment Command, in Kaiserslautern
 Special Troops Battalion, in Kaiserslautern
  7th Mission Support Command, in Kaiserslautern
 361st Civil Affairs Brigade, in Kaiserslautern
 457th Civil Affairs Battalion, in Grafenwöhr
 Transportation Battalion (Movement Control) - Headquarters & Headquarters Company, in Kaiserslautern
 406th Human Resources Company, in Kaiserslautern
 446th Human Resources Company, in Kaiserslautern
 221st Public Affairs Detachment, in Kaiserslautern
 589th Engineer Detachment, in Kaiserslautern
 773rd Civil Support Team, in Kaiserslautern
 7th Intermediate Level Education Detachment, in Grafenwöhr
 209th Digital Liaison Detachment, in Wiesbaden
 2500th Digital Liaison Detachment, in Vicenza, Italy
 Medical Support Unit - Europe, in Kaiserslautern
  16th Sustainment Brigade, in Baumholder
  18th Military Police Brigade, in Grafenwoehr
 30th Medical Brigade, in Sembach
 212th Combat Support Hospital, in Kaiserslautern
 421st Medical Battalion (Multifunctional), in Baumholder
  405th Army Field Support Brigade, in Kaiserslautern
 Base Support Operations Maintenance Division, in Grafenwöhr (with Teams in Ansbach, Baumholder, Garmisch, Grafenwöhr, Hohenfels, Kaiserslautern, Stuttgart, Vilseck and Wiesbaden)
 Base Support Operations Transport Division, in Kaiserslautern
 Logistics Readiness Center Baumholder
 Logistics Readiness Center Bavaria, in Grafenwöhr (Parts in Garmisch, Hohenfels and Vilseck)
 Logistics Readiness Center Rheinland-Pfalz, in Kaiserslautern (Parts in Sembach)
 Logistics Readiness Center Stuttgart
 Army Oil Analysis Program Europe, in Kaiserslautern
 Army Test, Measurement, and Diagnostic Equipment Activity, in Kaiserslautern
 Army Garrison Ansbach Logistics Readiness Center
 Army Garrison Vicenza Logistics Readiness Center
 Army Garrison Wiesbaden Logistics Readiness Center
 Army Garrison Benelux Logistics
  409th Contracting Support Brigade, in Kaiserslautern
 903rd Contracting Battalion, in Kaiserslautern
 928th Contracting Battalion, in Grafenwöhr
 Theater Contracting Center, in Kaiserslautern
 Regional Contracting Office - Benelux , in Brussels, Belgium
 Regional Contracting Office Stuttgart, in Stuttgart
 Regional Contracting Office Stuttgart, in Wiesbaden
 1st Human Resources Sustainment Center, in Kaiserslautern
  266th Financial Management Support Center, in Kaiserslautern
 Theater Logistics Support Center - Europe, in Kaiserslautern
 Sustainment Task Force 16, at Mihail Kogălniceanu Airport (RoAF 57th Air Base), Romania 
 Task Force East

Former notable members
Steven A. Shapiro, previous commanding general
 Joe Weingarten, honorary colonel

References

External links
21st Theater Sustainment Command

Theater 021
Military units and formations established in 2000